Oleh Tverdokhlib (3 November 1969 in Dnipropetrovsk – 18 September 1995) was a Ukrainian athlete. He was still an improving competitor at 400 metre hurdles when he was killed by electric shock while fixing wiring at his parental home in September 1995.

At global level in athletics he had finished both sixth in the 1992 Summer Olympics and 1993 World Championships in Athletics finals at 400m hurdles. Previously he had taken the bronze medal at the 1991 Summer Universiade.

His biggest triumph was undoubtedly his victory at the 1994 European Championships in Athletics held in Helsinki, Finland. On 10 August 1994 he ran a personal best and Ukrainian record of 48.06 seconds to claim gold and win the European title. This enabled him to represent Team Europe at the 1994 IAAF World Cup in this discipline. He again excelled at this meeting with a superb second place behind Samuel Matete of Zambia and Team Africa.

External links

References

1969 births
1995 deaths
Ukrainian male hurdlers
Athletes (track and field) at the 1992 Summer Olympics
Olympic athletes of the Unified Team
Sportspeople from Dnipro
Accidental deaths by electrocution
European Athletics Championships medalists
Universiade medalists in athletics (track and field)
Universiade bronze medalists for the Soviet Union
Soviet male hurdlers